The 16th Combat Aviation Brigade is a Combat Aviation Brigade of the United States Army. It is subordinate to 7th Infantry Division and I Corps and based at Joint Base Lewis-McChord (JBLM).

Structure

The 16th Combat Aviation Brigade currently consists of the following units:
 Headquarters and Headquarters Company (HHC)
  4th Squadron (Air Cavalry), 6th Cavalry Regiment, AH-64E Apache and RQ-7 Shadow
  1st Battalion (Attack), 229th Aviation Regiment , AH-64E Apache
  2nd Battalion (Assault), 158th Aviation Regiment , UH-60 Black Hawk
  1st Battalion (General Support), 52nd Aviation Regiment, UH-60, CH-47 Chinook and UH-60A+ (MEDEVAC) (supporting US Army Alaska)
  46th Aviation Support Battalion

History
The brigade traces its history to the activation of the 16th Aviation Group (Combat) on 23 January 1968 subordinate to United States Army Pacific at Marble Mountain in Da Nang, South Vietnam. At the time of activation the group consisted of the 14th Aviation Battalion (Combat) and the 212th Aviation Battalion (Combat Support) with a total combat force 3,300 personnel. Operating in the I Corps area, its 14th Aviation Battalion (Combat) provided air assault to the 101st Airborne Division and the United States Marine Corps. The 212th Aviation Battalion (Combat Support) carried out aerial reconnaissance and surveillance.

Structure between February and March 1971:
 335th Transportation Company
 362nd Aviation Detachment
 123rd Aviation Battalion
 Troop D, 1st Squadron, 1st Cavalry
 Troop F, 8th Cavalry
 Company E, 723rd Maintenance Battalion
 14th Aviation Battalion
 71st Aviation Company
 116th Aviation Company
 132nd Aviation Company
 174th Aviation Company
 176th Aviation Company
 178th Aviation Company
 534th Medical Detachment
 756th Medical Detachment

In the years after the war the group was disbanded.

In October 2005 Task Force 49 was formed at Fort Wainwright, Alaska. It oversaw 1st Battalion, 52d Aviation Regiment; 4th Battalion, 123rd Aviation Regiment; 68th Medical Company (Air Ambulance); and Company C (Maintenance), 123d Aviation Regiment. In February 2006 Task Force 49 was formally established and the 4th Battalion, 123d Aviation Regiment was inactivated, while the 1st Battalion, 52d Aviation Regiment was reorganized into a general support aviation battalion. In June 2006 the 6th Squadron, 17th Cavalry Regiment was reflagged from 3d Squadron, 4th Cavalry Regiment, flying OH-58D Kiowa Warrior light reconnaissance helicopters and relocated from Wheeler Army Airfield, Hawaii to Fort Wainwright.

On 16 October 2009, Aviation Task Force 49 was disbanded, and "reflagged" as 16th Combat Aviation Brigade, and thus activated at Fort Wainwright, Alaska.

On 31 March 2011, it was announced that the 16th Combat Aviation Brigade would be based at Joint Base Lewis McChord but still keep a substantial presence (1–52d Aviation) at Fort Wainwright. It was also announced that the 4th Squadron, 6th Cavalry Regiment would join the brigade and that 1st Battalion, 229th Aviation would move from Fort Hood to JBLM. Joint Base Lewis-McChord held a flag ceremony on 1 August 2011 to signify the movement of the headquarters of the 16th Combat Aviation Brigade from Fort Wainwright, Alaska. This process would end around September 2014.

References

External links
 Official homepage of 16th Combat Aviation Brigade 
 4-3 moves to 16th CAB
 Army Aviation: Full Spectrum Capability
 16th CAB to station at JBLM
 Combat helicopter brigade forming at JBLM
 Two Change of Command ceremonies set for JBLM

Military units and formations established in 2009
016